Heinrich Bender (2 December 1902 – 10 July 1943) was a German rower. He competed in the men's eight event at the 1932 Summer Olympics. He was killed in action during World War II.

References

1902 births
1943 deaths
German male rowers
Olympic rowers of Germany
Rowers at the 1932 Summer Olympics
Sportspeople from Karlsruhe (region)
German military personnel killed in World War II
People from Neckar-Odenwald-Kreis